Sweet Sixteen is a cultivar of domesticated apple.

Origin

The Sweet Sixteen apple was developed at the University of Minnesota in 1977.

Growing

Characteristics

The Sweet Sixteen is crisp and juicy, has an exotic yellow flesh, mixed with red. It is very sweet, with an unusual flavor  of sugar cane, or spicy cherry candy. The fruit can store for 5 to 8 weeks. The Sweet Sixteen is quite vigorous. The fruit may have premature drops. Sweet Sixteen usually ripens, mid- to late September.

The Sweet Sixteen is resistant to fire blight and scab. Sweet Sixteen has fragrant, and long-lasting white flowers

Fruit

The fruit is medium size, the apple red striped. Sweet Sixteen has medium storage.

Tolerance of cold climates

The Sweet Sixteen is one of the best apples to endure cold climates.

USDA Hardiness Zone

Sweet Sixteen has USDA Hardiness Zone of Zones 4 to 7, so can withstand cold winters.

General disease resistance

The Sweet Sixteen has good disease resistance.

Soil

The Sweet Sixteen thrives in sandy loam to clay loam soil.

Tolerances

Sweet Sixteen is moderately drought tolerant.

Light Range

Sweet Sixteen prefers full sun.

Preferred soil pH

Sweet Sixteen prefers a pH of 6.0—7.0.

Pollination

The Sweet Sixteen is not self-fertile, and may be pollinated by a variety of other apple cultivars.

Ripeness

The Sweet Sixteen ripens mid- to late September.

References

External links and references

 On growing Sweet Sixteen apples

Minnesota University breeds